Lashgari (adjective form of لشگر (lašgar) – a non-standard alternative form of لشکر (laškar) meaning "army"; "division" – and thus roughly translating as "military", "martial") is a Persian surname. Notable people with the surname include:

 Ali Lashgari (born 19??), Iranian football player
 Ehsan Lashgari (born 1985), Iranian wrestler

See also 
 Lashkar (disambiguation)
 Lashkari (disambiguation)

References 

Persian-language surnames